Rivière-au-Renard is a village in the Gaspé Peninsula, in the province of Quebec, Canada, part of the Town of Gaspé.

Originally settled in the 1790s by French-Canadian and Irish families, Rivière-au-Renard is located on the banks of a large open bay on the Gulf of Saint Lawrence at the eastern end of the Gaspé Peninsula. The town was originally populated by immigrants from Ireland, mostly those who remained in the area following the sinking of the Carrick in 1847.

In 1971, this former municipality was amalgamated into the Town of Gaspé.

Notable people
Laurence Jalbert, singer
Sandra Dumaresq, actor
Cédric Paquette, NHL hockey player

References

External links

Communities in Gaspésie–Îles-de-la-Madeleine
Former municipalities in Quebec
Gaspé, Quebec
Populated places disestablished in 1971